Mathew de Redman (fl. 1294–1307) was an English politician.

He was a Member (MP) of the Parliament of England for Lancashire in 1294 and 1307.

References

13th-century births
14th-century deaths
English MPs 1294
English MPs 1307
Members of the Parliament of England (pre-1707) for Lancashire